Ifigenia in Tauride is an opera in three acts by Gian Francesco de Majo to a libretto by Mattia Verazi. It was commissioned by  Elector Palatine Carl Theodor, and premiered in 1764.

References

Operas
1764 operas
Operas by Gian Francesco de Majo
Italian-language operas